IntraFish Media is the world's leading source of news, prices and analysis for the global seafood, commercial fisheries and aquaculture industries.

The company was founded in 1996 in Norway. Today, IntraFish has offices in Seattle, London, Puerto Varas (Chile), Singapore, New York and Bergen, Norway.

IntraFish produces both online and print titles, including IntraFish.com, IntraFish Magazine, IntraFish Aquaculture and IntraFish Fisheries.

The family of publications and websites also includes IntraFish.no, TekFisk.no and Fiskeribladet.no, which cover the aquaculture, fisheries and seafood innovation sectors in Norway.

The group also produces live events, including the Seafood Investor Forum, and Business Intelligence reports on a range of topics.

IntraFish is a part of Oslo-based NHST Media Group, which produces a range of financial titles covering the blue economy and energy sectors, including Tradewinds, Upstream, Recharge and Dagens Næringsliv Dagens Næringsliv, Norway's largest financial news provider.

External links
 intrafish.com
 intrafish.no
 fiskeribladet.no
 tekfisk.no

News agencies based in Norway